Adelabad (also Romanized as ʿĀdelābād) is a village in Naghan Rural District of Naghan District, Kiar County, Chaharmahal and Bakhtiari province, Iran. At the 2006 census, its population was 621 in 125 households, when it was in Ardal County. The following census in 2011 counted 564 people in 151 households, by which time it was in the newly established Kiar County. The latest census in 2016 showed a population of 525 people in 149 households; it was the largest village in its rural district. The village is populated by Lurs.

References 

Kiar County

Populated places in Chaharmahal and Bakhtiari Province

Populated places in Kiar County

Luri settlements in Chaharmahal and Bakhtiari Province